Mauricio Quintanilla may refer to:

 Mauricio Quintanilla (footballer, born 1952) (El Chino), Salvadoran football forward from San Salvador
 Mauricio Quintanilla (footballer, born 1981), Salvadoran football defender from Ilopango